Mary Merritt Crawford (February 18, 1884 – November 25, 1972), known as Mollie Crawford, was an American surgeon. She was Brooklyn's first female ambulance surgeon, worked as a surgeon in France during the First World War, and co-founded the American Women's Hospitals Service.

Personal life

Early life 
Mary Merritt Crawford was born February 18, 1884, in Manhattan, one of eight siblings. She attended Cornell University, graduating in 1904, and received her medical degree in 1907.

Later years and death 
Shortly after returning from the First World War, Crawford married Edward Schuster. They had one daughter, Mary (born 1917).

Crawford retired in 1949, aged 65, and died at New York City's Midtown Hospital on November 25, 1972, aged 88.

Career 

After obtaining her medical degree, Crawford earned an internship position at the Williamsburg Hospital. 

Internship advertisements at the time typically asked only for male students, but an oversight led to the Williamsburg Hospital not including that stipulation in their ad. Crawford applied, and gained the highest grade – out of 35 applicants, the others all male – at the entrance exam. Crawford's position made her Brooklyn's first female ambulance surgeon. Her first ambulance call was on January 15, 1908, to a man who had fallen from a window. Being the first woman on this ambulance service, Crawford created her own uniform for her work.

In 1910 she started her own medical practice in Brooklyn alongside her work at the hospital. She travelled to France – as one of 6 American surgeons funded by Anna Gould – during the First World War, serving as an anesthesiologist and house surgeon at the American Ambulance Hospital at Neuilly-sur-Seine for a period of one year.

After her return, Crawford gave lectures to raise money for hospitals in France, and – alongside Rosalie Slaughter Morton – led the American Women's Hospitals Service from 1917 after it was founded by the Medical Women's National Association with the aim of establishing American hospitals in Europe.

Crawford was appointed as chairman of the Medical Women's National Association in June 1918. In 1919 she led the creation of a medical department at the Federal Reserve Bank as its medical director, and in 1929 became the head of the health service for the American Woman's Association at their clubhouse.

References 

1884 births
1972 deaths
American surgeons
20th-century women scientists
American women physicians
American women in World War I
People from Manhattan
People from Brooklyn
Cornell University alumni
Physicians from New York (state)
Women surgeons
20th-century surgeons